Captorhinida (older name: Cotylosauria) is a doubly paraphyletic grouping of early reptiles. Robert L. Carroll (1988) ranked it as an order in the subclass Anapsida, composed of the following suborders:

 A paraphyletic Captorhinomorpha, containing the families Protorothyrididae, Captorhinidae, Bolosauridae, Acleistorhinidae and possibly also Batropetidae
 Procolophonia, containing families Nyctiphruretidae, Procolophonidae and Sclerosauridae
 Pareiasauroidea, with families Rhipaeosauridae and Pareiasauridae
 Millerosauroidea, with a single family Millerettidae.

While they all share primitive features and resemble the ancestors of all modern reptiles, some of these families are more closely related to (or belong to) the clade Parareptilia, while others are further along the line leading to diapsids. For this reason, the group is only used informally, if at all, by most modern paleontologists. All members of this group are thought to be extinct.

References 

Prehistoric reptile taxonomy
Prehistoric animal orders
Tetrapod orders
Paraphyletic groups